Joshua Kenneth Richards is a Canadian social media personality and influencer. He has a following on a number of social media platforms and serves as the CEO of CrossCheck Studios.

Early life 
Richards was born on January 31, 2002, in Toronto, Ontario. He has 2 younger siblings.

Career 
Richards has garnered a following of 25.7 million on TikTok, 2.4 million on YouTube, 2.4 million on Twitter, and 7.3 million on Instagram. His posts often include sports content, dancing, lip syncing, comedy, and video skits. He has acted in films including Brother's Keeper, Summertime Dropouts, and the upcoming Dream Scenario with Nicolas Cage and Noah Centineo.

Richards is the co-founder of digital management company TalentX Entertainment. Subsequently, Richards signed a recording contract with Warner Records and the first artist to sign with TalentX in July 2020.

He is an investor, helping form a $15 million venture capital fund.  Richards is also the co-founder of energy drink Ani Energy, and previously served as the chief strategy officer of Triller.
 
According to a Forbes report published in January 2022, Richards earned an estimated $5 million in 2021 from his numerous sponsorship deals and business endeavors, making him the fourth highest-earning TikTok personality.

More recently, he and his production company CrossCheck Studios struck a first-look deal with Amazon.

He is a co-host of the BFFs podcast, a Barstool Sports podcast, with David Portnoy.

Discography
"Still Softish" feat. Bryce Hall (single, 2020)

See also 

 List of most-followed TikTok accounts

References

External links 
 

2002 births
21st-century Canadian businesspeople
21st-century Canadian male actors
21st-century Canadian male musicians
21st-century Canadian male singers
Male actors from Ontario
Barstool Sports people
Businesspeople from Ontario
Canadian company founders
Canadian emigrants to the United States
Canadian YouTubers
Living people
Canadian TikTokers
Musicians from Ontario